WCHL (1360 kHz) is a commercial AM radio station in Chapel Hill, North Carolina.  It is owned by the Chapel Hill Media Group and it has a format of news, talk, sports and adult album alternative music.   It is a network affiliate of CBS Radio News.  Much of its programming is geared towards the Chapel Hill/Carrboro community, with a focus on local news and community-affairs programming.  The studios are on South Estes Drive in Chapel Hill.

By day, WCHL transmits with 5,000 watts non-directional, but to protect other stations on 1360 AM from interference, at night it reduces power to 1,000 watts and uses a directional antenna.  Programming is also heard on 250-watt FM translator W250BP at 97.9 MHz in Chapel Hill.

History

WCHL was owned by Sandy McClamroch, who went on to become the town's longest-serving mayor. Originally a 1,000-watt station, the station boosted its daytime power to 5,000 watts in 1978. WCHL served as the launching point for the Village Broadcasting Companies, which bought Burlington's WBAG-FM in 1983, moving it to Raleigh as WZZU (now WNCB "B93.9").

Over the years, the station developed a loyal following for being highly community-oriented. The WCHL news department brought home many Associated Press awards and launched the career of several nationally renowned journalists and sports broadcasters.  Charles Kuralt and Jim Lampley began their broadcast careers at WCHL while students at the University of North Carolina.  WCHL played Top 40 music, and later adult contemporary before going to a news/talk format in the early 1990s. 

In 1997, The Village Companies (now Vilcom) sold WCHL to the Raleigh-based Curtis Media Group for $400,000. Curtis moved WCHL's operations to the WDNC studios at the Durham Bulls Athletic Park.  It ended the highly acclaimed local news and community-driven talk for an automated adult standards and oldies format, limited news and a simulcast morning show with co-located WDNC.  However, in 2002, Vilcom regained control of its former property's sales and programming under a local marketing agreement (LMA).  Vilcom moved the station back to Chapel Hill and returned the station's format to local news and talk on November 25, 2002, just two months before the station celebrated its 50th anniversary in 2003. In June 2004, Vilcom bought the station back from Curtis Media Group for $775,000.

Vilcom's longtime owner, Jim Heavner, sold a minority stake in WCHL to Barry Leffler, former president of WNCN in Raleigh, in late 2009. By this time WCHL had a progressive talk format, using programming from Air America. Leffler became the station's CEO and managing partner.  Heavner remained as chairman. Under Leffler, WCHL added more local news, an FM signal, and the Chapelboro web site.

On January 21, 2010, WCHL's network Air America filed for Chapter 7 bankruptcy and ceased live programming the same night.  Reruns of Air America's programming continued to air until Monday, January 25 at 9 p.m..

In 2014, Leffler, who had run WCHL since 2009, left the station for Tenet Healthcare in Dallas, Texas.

In August 2015, WCHL was purchased by Leslie Rudd who brought in several local investors, Chris Ehrenfeld, Jim Kitchen and Mark Vitali to form Chapel Hill Media Group, LLC.  Soon after, the station switched formats to incorporate music along with its lineup of live shows each weekday morning and afternoon.  It plays adult album alternative music, giving WCHL a more diverse playlist than most formats.

At the end of 2016 WCHL moved to University Place and re-branded as "97.9 The Hill WCHL."  It is currently known for continuing the tradition of community programming by providing local news, neighborhood events and high school sports, along with its music programming.  Its website is Chapelboro.com, a daily local news source for Chapel Hill and the surrounding area.

Ron Stutts retired on December 18, 2020, after 43 years as morning host. His show was replaced in 2021 by "This Morning with Aaron Keck", while news director Brighton McConnell took over Keck's afternoon shift.

Sports programming
WCHL was a longtime flagship station of North Carolina Tar Heels football and basketball.  Vilcom was the rights holder for Tar Heel sports until selling them to Learfield Communications in the early 21st century, and Heavner was Woody Durham's color commentator on Tar Heel broadcasts for 18 years.

Ron Stutts, the station's morning drive-time host from 1977 until his retirement in 2020, hosts an hour-long pregame show before the Tar Heel Sports Network begins its coverage.

In 2022, UNC moved its Research Triangle-area affiliation to 680 WPTF Raleigh. The deal made WPTF the network's new flagship, though WCHL remains as an affiliate station. WCHL continues as the exclusive home for Tar Heel baseball and women's basketball.

WCHL also airs high school sports.

Transmission
WCHL's 5,000-watt non-directional daytime signal cuts back to 1,000 watts directional toward the southeast at sunset.  The station has continuously broadcast from its two-tower array on Franklin Street, noticeable for being emblazoned with metal call letters on one tower and its frequency on the other.

In 2012, WCHL expanded to the FM band by acquiring a translator station from Liberty University in Virginia. The station, previously licensed to Creedmoor, North Carolina, at 98.5 FM, moved to Chapel Hill and to 97.9 MHz.  The call sign is W250BP. The translator is intended to improve nighttime reception of the station and to allow listeners who prefer FM radio to tune in.  In the fall of 2012, WCHL rebranded itself as 97.9 WCHL, while retaining its AM 1360 signal.

Chapelboro
Using materials produced by its news team, WCHL owns and operates the online local newspaper Chapelboro.

References

External links

CHL (AM)
Mass media in Chapel Hill-Carrboro, North Carolina
News and talk radio stations in the United States
Full service radio stations in the United States
Radio stations established in 1953
1953 establishments in North Carolina